Badarganj is an Upazila of Rangpur District in the Division of Rangpur, Bangladesh.

History
Legend has it that Badarganj is named after the mystic-saint Hazrat Badaruddin Shah. His tomb is situated in the middle of the town.
After the conquests of Bengal, Turk Commander Ikhtiyar Uddin Muhammad bin Bakhtiyar Khilji stopped over at a field at Mansinghapur, Madai Khamar during his invasion of Tibet in 1203 AD to feed his horses. After that event, the field is named 'Bakhtiyar Danga'.

At Jharuar Beel and Padmapukur, mass killing occurred during the liberation war of Bangladesh.

Geography
It has a total area 301.29 km2. It is surrounded by Taraganj Upazila, Rangpur Sadar Upazila and Saidpur Upazila on the north, Nawabganj Upazila on the south, Rangpur Sadar Upazila and Mithapukur Upazilas on the east, Parbatipur Upazila on the west.

Rivers and depressions
Jamuneshwari, Chirnai, Katgara and Chikli are main rivers that run through Badarganj. Bhelakoba, Nandair, Chaprar, Haribhanga beels are main depressions.

Demographics

According to the 2011 Bangladesh census, Badarganj Upazila had 71,982 households and a population of 287,699, 8.8% of whom lived in urban areas. 10.5% of the population was under the age of 5. The literacy rate (age 7 and over) was 43.0%, compared to the national average of 51.8%.

Economy
Badarganj is well known for the production of shataranchi (a kind of tapestry). Among other cottage industries of the upazila are bamboo work 159, weaving 15, goldsmith 8, blacksmith 12, potteries 20, wood work 40, tailoring 30, bidi 70.

Points of interest
Among Archaeological heritage and relics are Nine-domed Mosque at Lal Dighir Par of Radhanagar union, tomb of Kutub Shah at Kutubpur union, Bakhtyar Danga, Vhim Garh at Mansinghapur, Madai Khamar, Zamindar Bari at Dilalpur.

Administration
Badarganj was made a thana in 1905 and was turned into an upazila in 1983.

Badarganj Upazila is divided into Badarganj Municipality and ten union parishads: Bishnupur, Damodarpur, Gopalpur, Gopinathpur, Kalupara, Kutubpur, Lohanipara, Madhupur, Radhanagar, and Ramnathpur. The union parishads are subdivided into 64 mauzas and 120 villages.

Health centres include Upazila health complex 1, union health and family welfare centre 10, health centre 1. Religious institutions Mosque 315, temple 32, church 6, sacred place 1. There are above hats, bazars and fairs Total in Badarganj. The most noted hats and bazars are Badarganj, Laldighi, Kutubpur, Bagmara, Faridpur, Bakshmiganj, Bagarganj, Mominpur hat; noted fairs are Badarganj fair, Pirpal (Laldighi) Fair, Bakshmiganj and Badarganj fair.
BRAC, ASA, Grameen bank, RDRS, Seba, Grambikash are active NGOs in Badarganj.

See also
Upazilas of Bangladesh
Districts of Bangladesh
Divisions of Bangladesh

References

Upazilas of Rangpur District